The Mangrove Tower was a proposed multipurpose skyscraper for San Juan, Puerto Rico, that if built, would have been the tallest building in the Caribbean.

History 
The building was to be located on the Martin Peña Channel waterfront across the street from the José Miguel Agrelot Coliseum and right next to the Milla de Oro area. The proposal took inspiration from the mangrove trees located on the channel. The building would be composed of four distinct towers which would twist together similar to the mangrove branches, giving people the opportunity to move horizontally and diagonally. The entanglement of the different structures would be hidden behind a façades with different treatments, such as an "interlaced net" mimicking a mangrove. The mangrove-tree inspiration would be further stressed by the use of vegetation and water features throughout the structure. It would have "house[d] apartments, businesses, public spaces and...a hotel," and "direct access to the area’s bus and train stations [as well as a] future connection to a ferry stop."

The lot is now home to the Trocadero Diverplex, which houses commercial, entertainment and tourism spaces.

References 

Proposed skyscrapers in the United States
Unbuilt buildings and structures in the United States
Unbuilt skyscrapers
Buildings and structures in San Juan, Puerto Rico